was a Japanese actor from Hokkaido.

In 1953, he signed to the Toei Company and made his film debut in Gakusei Goninotoko. He is most famous for playing villains and appeared more than 200 films. He also had many guest appearances as a villain in television dramas. His final role was Yoshinaka in the 1980 miniseries Shōgun.

Selected filmography

Film
' 'Planet Prince (1959)
' 'The Mad Fox (1962)
 A Fugitive from the Past (1965) as Monk
 The Valiant Red Peony (1968)
 Onna Gokuakuchō (1970) as Akaza Matajūrō
 Battles Without Honor and Humanity: Proxy War (1973)
 Lady Snowblood (1973) as Maruyama
 The Street Fighter (1974)
 Lupin III: Strange Psychokinetic Strategy (1974)
 The Return of the Sister Street Fighter (1975) as Wang Long-Ming
 New Battles Without Honor and Humanity: Last Days of the Boss (1975) as Kurihara 
 Karate Kiba (1976)
 Empire of Passion (1978)
 Bandits vs. Samurai Squadron (1978)
 Nichiren (1979) as Ichi Shigenao
 Barefoot Gen Part 3: Battle of Hiroshima (1980) as Okauchi
 Shōgun (1980) as Yoshinaka

Television
Regular
Seven Color Mask (1959)
Ten to Chito (1969 Taiga drama) as Matano
Shin Heike Monogatari (1972 Taiga drama) as Jitsusōbō
Guest
Key Hunter episodes 25 & 50
Kogarashi Monjirō (1972) episode 6
Nemuri Kyōshirō (1973) episode 26
Taiyō ni Hoero! episodes 26 & 162
Hissatsu Shiokinin episode 26
Tasukenin Hashiru episode 28
Kurayami Shitomenin episode 5
Hissatsu Shiokiya Kagyō episode 26
Shin Hissatsu Shiokinin episode 2
Edo Professional Hissatsu Shōbainin episode 26
Oshizamurai Kiichihōgan episode 7
Nagasaki Hangachōu episode 5
Daitsuiseki episodes 17 & 25
G-Men '75 episodes 185 & 186
Tantei Monogatari

External links

References

1927 births
1980 deaths
20th-century Japanese male actors